Hyon may refer to:
 Hyon, village in Mons, Belgium
 Hyeon, historical administrative subdivisions of Korea
 Hyon (Korean name), Korean family name and given name